Milk had received accolades from several film critics organizations.

 December 2, 2008, the film received 4 nominations for the 24th Independent Spirit Awards and won 2, including Best Supporting Male (James Franco) and Best First Screenplay (Dustin Lance Black).
 December 9, 2008, the film received eight Critic's Choice Award nominations, including Best Picture and Best Director.
 December 11, 2008, Sean Penn received one Golden Globe nomination for Best Actor, the film's only nomination.
 December 18, 2008, the Screen Actors Guild nominated Milk on three categories: Best Actor, Best Supporting Actor and Best Cast in a Motion Picture for the 15th Screen Actors Guild Awards; Sean Penn was chosen as Best Actor.
 January 5, 2009, the film's producers received a nomination for Producer of the Year for the 20th Producers Guild of America Awards.
 January 8, 2009, Gus Van Sant received a nomination for Outstanding Directorial Achievement for the 61st Directors Guild of America Awards.
 The film won Best Original Screenplay at the 62nd Writers Guild of America Awards
 The film received four BAFTA award nominations, including Best Film, for the 62nd British Academy Film Awards.
 January 22, 2009 the film received 8 Academy Award nominations, including Best Picture, and winning two for Best Original Screenplay and Best Actor in a Leading Role (Sean Penn).

References

External links
 

Lists of accolades by film